Skellefteå Municipality is a municipality in Västerbotten County in northern Sweden. Its seat is located in Skellefteå.

History
Most of the amalgamations leading to the present municipality took place in 1967 when the then "City of Skellefteå" was merged with the rural municipality by the same name and also with the municipalities Jörn, Bureå and Byske. The enlarged city became a municipality of unitary type with the new local government act in 1971, and in 1974 the municipalities Burträsk and Lövånger were added.

Geography
The municipality borders in the south to Robertsfors Municipality, and clockwise to Umeå, Vindeln, Norsjö, Arvidsjaur and Piteå municipalities. Skellefteå is the largest coastline municipality by area, being roughly 15 percent larger than the second largest, Örnsköldsvik Municipality.

Skellefteå is situated around Skellefte River, a river that runs through the city. There is also a very central mountain, Vitberget, which is popular for skiing in the wintertime, and hiking in the summer.

Localities
There are 20 localities (or urban areas) in Skellefteå Municipality:

The municipal seat in bold

Economy
The largest employer in Skellefteå Municipality is the mining company Boliden AB, with about 1,200 employees.

Elections

Riksdag
These are the results of the elections to the Riksdag for Kiruna Municipality since the 1972 municipal reform. SCB did not publish the party's results for the Sweden Democrats between 1988 and 1998 because of the party's small size nationally.

Blocs

This lists the relative strength of the socialist and centre-right blocs since 1973, but parties not elected to the Riksdag are inserted as "other", including the Sweden Democrats results from 1988 to 2006, but also the Christian Democrats pre-1991 and the Greens in 1982, 1985 and 1991. The sources are identical to the table above. The coalition or government mandate marked in bold formed the government after the election. New Democracy got elected in 1991 but are still listed as "other" due to the short lifespan of the party.

Demographics

2022 by district
This is a demographic table based on Skellefteå Municipality's electoral districts in the 2022 Swedish general election sourced from SVT's election platform, in turn taken from SCB official statistics.

Residents include everyone registered as living in the district, regardless of age or citizenship status. Valid voters indicate Swedish citizens above the age of 18 who therefore can vote in general elections. Left vote and right vote indicate the result between the two major blocs in said district in the 2022 general election. Employment indicates the share of people between the ages of 20 and 64 who are working taxpayers. Foreign background denotes residents either born abroad or with two parents born outside of Sweden. Median income is the received monthly income through either employment, capital gains or social grants for the median adult above 20, also including pensioners in Swedish kronor. College graduates indicates any degree accumulated after high school.

There were 73,333 residents, of whom 56,888 were Swedish citizens of voting age. 63.1 % voted for the left coalition and 35.7 % for the right coalition.

Twin towns – sister cities

Skellefteå is twinned with:
 Pardubice, Czech Republic
 Raahe, Finland
 Rana, Norway

 Tongling, China
 Vesthimmerland, Denmark

Notable natives
Jan Erixon, ice hockey player
Andreas Hedlund, musician
Stieg Larsson, journalist and author of The Girl with the Dragon Tattoo
Joakim Nyström, tennis player
Victoria Silvstedt, model
Margot Wallström, politician
The Wannadies, pop group

See also
Norra Västerbotten, local newspaper
Skellefteå AIK, local ice hockey club

References

External links

Skellefteå Municipality – Official site 
Tourism site 

 
Municipalities of Västerbotten County